Loreto Seguel King (born 25 October 1976) is a Chilean politician and civil engineer. She served as minister of woman during the first government of Sebastián Piñera.

References

External links
 

1955 births
Living people
Chilean people
Pontifical Catholic University of Chile alumni
University of Minnesota alumni
21st-century Chilean politicians